Cynthia Ogunsemilore is a Nigerian boxer. She participated in the 2022 Commonwealth Games in Lightweight winning a bronze medal.

References 

Living people
Boxers at the 2022 Commonwealth Games
Commonwealth Games bronze medallists for Nigeria
2002 births
Commonwealth Games medallists in boxing
21st-century Nigerian women
Medallists at the 2022 Commonwealth Games